Till We Meet Again is a 1936 American film directed by Robert Florey and starring Herbert Marshall and Gertrude Michael. Marshall and Michael also starred in Till We Meet Again, released later in 1936.

Plot
On the eve of World War I, Austrian stage star Elsa Duranyi and her English counterpart Alan Barclay plan to marry. But she disappears and he enters the intelligence service, adopting the identity of a dead man. In Monte Carlo, he encounters his former fiancée only to discover that she is also spying for her country.

Cast 
 Herbert Marshall as Alan Barclay
 Gertrude Michael as Elsa Duranyi
 Lionel Atwill as Ludwig
 Rod La Rocque as Carl Schrottle
 Guy Bates Post as Captain Minton
 Vallejo Gantner as Vogel
 Torben Meyer as Kraus
 Julia Faye as Nurse
 Egon Brecher as Schultz
 Frank Reicher as Colonel Von Diegel

References

External links 
 

1936 films
1936 romantic drama films
1930s spy films
American black-and-white films
American romantic drama films
American spy films
1930s English-language films
Films directed by Robert Florey
Films scored by Friedrich Hollaender
Films set in Germany
Films set in London
Films set in Monaco
Paramount Pictures films
World War I spy films
1930s American films